Acacia gladiiformis, commonly known as sword wattle or sword-leaf wattle, is a shrub belonging to the genus Acacia and the subgenus Phyllodineae that is native to parts of eastern Australia.

Description
It usually blooms between July and October producing inflorescences that appear in clusters of 3 to 12 found in axillary racemes.

Taxonomy
The species was first formally described by the botanist George Bentham from specimens collected by Allan Cunningham in 1842 as part of William Jackson Hooker's work Notes on Mimoseae, with a synopsis of species as published in the London Journal of Botany. It was reclassified as Racosperma gladiiforme in 2003 by Leslie Pedley then transferred back to the genus Acacia in 2006.
The specific epithet it taken from the Latin word for sword in reference to the shape of the phyllodes.

Distribution
It is found on the tablelands and western slopes of the Great Dividing Range in New South Wales from Warialda in the north through to Cowra in the south as a part of Eucalyptus woodland communities growing in rocky soils over and around granite or sandstone. The plant is also known in south east Queensland.

See also
 List of Acacia species

References

gladiiformis
Flora of New South Wales
Flora of Queensland
Plants described in 1842
Taxa named by George Bentham